Albana may refer to:

Albana (grape), an Italian wine grape
Albana, an alternative name for the German wine grape Elbling
Albana, an alternative name for the Spanish wine grape Tempranillo blanco
Albanopolis, an ancient city in Caucasian Albania, believed to have been located near modern Derbent
 A female name common in Albania